The Hu-Go Craft is a homebuilt biplane that was designed by Adolph B. Hugo, first flying on 19 April 1965.

Design and development
Hugo designed the biplane incorporating elements of popular homebuilt aircraft of the time. The aircraft was based loosely around the Great Lakes 2T-1E, with features from the Rose Parakeet and Waco Aircraft Company biplanes. Plans were sold for amateur construction.

The aircraft is a conventional landing gear equipped, single seat, open cockpit biplane, with a fuselage constructed from welded steel tubing with aircraft fabric covering and spruce wing spars. The tail surfaces are wire braced. The upper wing is swept, while only the lower wings have dihedral.

Construction of the prototype took 4 1/2 years and 2500 hours of time.

Specifications (Hu-Go Craft)

See also

References

Homebuilt aircraft